Lohnes is a surname. Notable people with the surname include:

Bruce Lohnes (born 1958), Canadian curler
George O. Lohnes (1898–1982), Canadian politician
Suzanne Lohnes-Croft, Canadian politician

See also
Johnes